A number of motorships have been named Clary, including:

Ship names